San Diego is a city in the U.S. state of California.

San Diego may also refer to:

Geography

Argentina 
 Cabo San Diego, a point of the Mitre Peninsula on Tierra del Fuego

Colombia 
 San Diego, Bogotá
 San Diego, Cesar, a town and municipality

Mexico 
 San Diego de la Unión, a city in Guanajuato
 Fort of San Diego, a fort in Acapulco, Guerrero

Spain 
 San Diego (Madrid), a neighborhood in Madrid, Spain

United States 
 San Diego, Texas
 San Diego County, California
 San Diego Bay
 San Diego River
 San Diego Creek, a creek in Orange County, California

Venezuela 
 San Diego, Carabobo, an agricultural town
 San Diego Municipality, Carabobo

Ships 
 San Diego (ship), a ship that Sebastian Vizcaino used to explore San Diego Bay
 USS San Diego (CA-6) or California (ACR-6), an armoured cruiser
 USS San Diego (CL-53), a light cruiser commissioned in 1942
 USS San Diego (AFS-6), a combat stores ship in service from 1969 to 1997
 USS San Diego (LPD-22), a San Antonio-class amphibious transport dock launched in 2010

People 
 Saint Diego (disambiguation)

Sports
San Diego Padres, a  major league baseball team since 1969
San Diego Padres (PCL), a minor league baseball team (1936-1968)
San Diego Toreros, athletic teams of the University of San Diego
San Diego Chargers, a former National Football League team that relocated to Los Angeles in 2017
San Diego Gunners, a member of American Football League (1944)

Education
 San Diego Unified School District
 University of San Diego

Other uses
 San Diego Freeway, a highway serving as the western bypass of Los Angeles
 San Diego Pro-cathedral, a Catholic church in the Philippines
 Mission San Diego de Alcalá, a Spanish mission in Alta California
 "San Diego," a 2016 song by Blink-182 from California
 San Diego, a code-name for a version of the Athlon 64 CPU from AMD
 San Diego Hills, a cemetery in Indonesia
 San Diego, a fictional town in the Philippines in the novel Noli Me Tángere by José Rizal

See also 
 Carmen Sandiego, a franchise of educational computer and video games, television programs, books and other media
 Carmen Sandiego (character), the title character of the franchise
 USS San Diego, a list of ships of the United States Navy
 San Diegan (train), a passenger train of the Atchison, Topeka and Santa Fe Railway
 Diego (disambiguation)
 Santiago (disambiguation)